Shue Ming-fa (born 2 November 1950) is a former Taiwanese cyclist. He competed in three events at the 1972 Summer Olympics.

References

External links
 

1950 births
Living people
Taiwanese male cyclists
Olympic cyclists of Taiwan
Cyclists at the 1972 Summer Olympics
Place of birth missing (living people)